David Mark Goss (April 20, 1952 – April 4, 2017) was a mathematician, a professor in the department of mathematics at Ohio State University, and the editor-in-chief of the Journal of Number Theory. He received his B.S. in mathematics in 1973 from University of Michigan and his Ph.D. in 1977 from Harvard University under the supervision of Barry Mazur; prior to Ohio State he held positions at Princeton University, Harvard, the University of California, Berkeley, and Brandeis University. He worked on function fields and introduced the Goss zeta function.

In 2012 he became a fellow of the American Mathematical Society.

Books

Selected papers

References

External links
Home page of David Goss
David Goss on MathSciNet

1952 births
2017 deaths
20th-century American mathematicians
21st-century American mathematicians
University of Michigan College of Literature, Science, and the Arts alumni
Harvard University alumni
Princeton University faculty
Harvard University faculty
University of California, Berkeley faculty
Brandeis University faculty
Ohio State University faculty
Fellows of the American Mathematical Society